Kürbitz is a former municipality in the district of Vogtlandkreis in Saxony in Germany located near Plauen. On 1 January 1999, the village was merged into the municipality Weischlitz.

History
The first documentary mention of Kürbitz dates from 1225.

See also
Rittergut Kürbitz

References

External links
 Pictures from Kürbitz in the archive of  Foto Marburg
 Kürbitz in the Digital Historic Index of Places in Saxony
 http://www.sr2-treffen.de
 Legend from lindworm of Kürbitz

Former municipalities in Saxony
Weischlitz